The Athenæum was a British literary magazine published in London, England, from 1828 to 1921.

Foundation
Initiated in 1828 by James Silk Buckingham, it was sold within a few weeks to Frederick Maurice and John Sterling, who failed to make it profitable. In 1829, Charles Wentworth Dilke became part proprietor and editor; he greatly extended the influence of the magazine. In 1846, he resigned the editorship and assumed that of the Daily News of London, but contributed a series of notable articles to the Athenaeum. The poet and critic Thomas Kibble Hervey succeeded Dilke as editor and served from 1846 until his resignation due to ill health in 1853. Historian and traveller William Hepworth Dixon succeeded Hervey in 1853, and remained editor until 1869.

Contributors
George Darley was a staff critic during the early years, and Gerald Massey contributed many literary reviews – mainly on poetry – during the period 1858 to 1868. George Henry Caunter was one of the principal early contributors, writing reviews of French-language books. His brother John Hobart Caunter also contributed reviews. H F Chorley covered musical topics from 1830 until 1868, starting well before the general emergence of regular journalistic music criticism in the mid 1840s. Theodore Watts-Dunton contributed regularly as the principal critic of poetry from 1875 until 1898. Frederic George Stephens was art editor from 1860 until 1901, when he was replaced by Roger Fry because of his unfashionable disapproval of Impressionism; Stephens continued to contribute book reviews and obituaries until 1904. Arthur Symons joined the staff in 1891.

Editor from 1871 to 1900 was Norman MacColl. During the 19th century, the Athenaeum received contributions from Lord Kelvin. During the early 20th Century, its contributors included Max Beerbohm, Edmund Blunden, T. S. Eliot, Robert Graves, Thomas Hardy, Aldous Huxley, Julian Huxley,  Katherine Mansfield, George Santayana, Edith Sitwell, and Virginia Woolf.

From 1849 to 1880 Geraldine Jewsbury contributed more than 2300 reviews. She was one of very few women who reviewed for the Athenaeum and started submitting her reviews regularly by 1854. She rated highly novels that showed character morality and were also entertaining. She criticized the "fallen woman" theme, which was common in Victorian literature. During the second half of the 1850s, Jewsbury was entrusted with editing the "New Novels" section.

Legacy
A letter from J. S. Cotton, reportedly printed during 1905, definitively tells of the first-ever reference to the playing of a match of cricket in India.

In 1921, with decreasing circulation, the Athenaeum was incorporated into its younger competitor: the Nation, becoming The Nation and Athenaeum. In 1931, this successor publication merged with the New Statesman, to form the New Statesman and Nation, eliminating the name Athenaeum after 97 years.

References

Further reading
Demoor, Marysa, Their Fair Share: Women, Power, and Criticism in the Athenaeum, from Millicent Garrett Fawcett to Katherine Mansfield, 1870–1920. Aldershot: Ashgate, 2000. 
Graham, Walter James, 'The Athenaeum', "English Literary Periodicals". New York: T. Nelson, 1930, pp. 317–21.

Marchand, Leslie A., "The Athenaeum: A Mirror of Victorian Culture". Chapel Hill: University of North Carolina Press, 1941.
Sullivan, Alvin, ed., 'The Athenaeum', "British Literary Magazines. Volume 3". Westport, Connecticut: Greenwood Press, 1983-, pp. 21–24.

External links
A selection of Gerald Massey's literary reviews for the Athenaeum
The Athenaeum Projects: Centre for Interactive Systems Research, City University, London - an index of all literary reviews from 1830 to 1870 - and all scientific reviews from 1828 to 1830.
Athenaeum review of  George Eliot's The Mill on the Floss by Geraldine Jewsbury, (April 7, 1860).

The Athenaeum on-line
Almost all volumes of The Athenaeum are available on-line.

Hathi Trust

The years 1828-1879 and certain years between 1880 and 1921 are freely available. 

For Copyright reasons the other years are only partially available in certain countries.
 

Internet Archive :

The following volumes are available :

Defunct literary magazines published in the United Kingdom
Magazines published in London
Magazines established in 1828
Magazines disestablished in 1921
1828 establishments in England
1921 disestablishments in England